EEM (2,4-diethoxy-5-methoxyamphetamine) is a lesser-known substituted amphetamine. It is a diethoxy-methoxy analog of trimethoxyamphetamine (TMA-2). EEM was first synthesized by Alexander Shulgin. In his book PiHKAL, both the dosage and duration are unknown. EEM produces few to no effects. Very little data exists about the pharmacological properties, metabolism, and toxicity of EEM.

See also 

 Phenethylamine
 Psychedelics, dissociatives and deliriants

References 

Substituted amphetamines
Phenol ethers